Loiret is a department in the Centre-Val de Loire region of north-central France. It takes its name from the river Loiret, which is contained wholly within the department. In 2019, Loiret had a population of 680,434.

As well as being the regional prefecture, it is a historic city on the banks of the Loire. It has a large central area with many historic buildings and mansions. Orléans Cathedral, dating back to the 13th century, was rebuilt after Protestant forces destroyed it in 1568. Loiret has two subprefectures, in Montargis and Pithiviers. It is famous for its several châteaux.

History

Loiret is one of the original 83 departments that was created during the French Revolution on March 4, 1790,  by order of the National Constituent Assembly. The new departments were to be uniformly administered and approximately equal to one another in size and population. 
It was created from the former province of Orléanais which was too large to continue in its previous form.

The Loire Valley was occupied in Palaeolithic times as attested by numerous archaeological sites in the department. The Celts were here, bringing crafts and trades, and the Romans occupied the area after the Gallic Wars. They built roads and founded cities such as Cenabum, on the site of present-day Orléans, and Sceaux-du-Gâtinais. Around 451, the Huns invaded the region but were repelled before reaching Cenabum. The Franks reached the Loire and Clovis I reigned in the area. A time of peace and prosperity ensued during the reign of Charlemagne.

Geography
The department of Loiret was historically in the province of Orléans in north central France, and along with the departments of Loir-et-Cher and Eure-et-Loir now forms the region Centre-Val de Loire. To the north of Loiret lie the departments of Eure-et-Loir, Essonne and Seine-et-Marne, to the east lies Yonne, to the southeast Nièvre, to the south Cher, and to the west Loir-et-Cher.

The department consists of mostly flat low-lying land through which flows the river Loire. This river enters the department near Châtillon-sur-Loire in the southeast, flows northwestwards to Orleans where it turns to flow south west, leaving the department near Beaugency. The Canal d'Orléans connects the Loire at Orléans to a junction with the Canal du Loing and the Canal de Briare in the village of Buges near Montargis. The Loire and these canals formed important trading routes before the arrival of the railways. Its source is at Orléans-la-Source, and its mouth at Saint-Hilaire-Saint-Mesmin. Other rivers in the department, are the Loing, a right-bank tributary of the Loire, and the Ouanne which flows into the Loing.

Large parts of the land are used for agriculture, and these are separated by low wooded hills and some forested areas. The northwestern part of the department is in the wheat-growing region known as Beauce, an undulating plateau with some of France's best agricultural land. This area was popular with the French aristocracy in the Middle Ages and the Renaissance period, and there are many historic châteaux in the department including Château d'Augerville, Château de Bellegarde, Château de Gien, Château du Hallier, Château de Meung-sur-Loire, Château de Sully-sur-Loire and Château de Trousse-Barrière.

The part of the department south of the Loire is known as the Sologne and is an area of heathland and marshland, interspersed by hills where vines are grown. The eastern part of the department is known as Gâtinais and was part of a province of that name. Until the beginning of the 21st century, it used to be renowned for the production of saffron, but the crop could not be mechanised, and production dwindled as the cost of production became too high.

Demography

Principal towns

The most populous commune is Orléans, the prefecture. As of 2019, there are 6 communes with more than 15,000 inhabitants, all of which part of the agglomeration of Orléans:

Economy
The soil is in general fertile and productive; the Beauce is the main wheat-growing region, oats are widely cultivated and rye is also grown. Other crops include fruit, asparagus, saffron and herbs. Vines are cultivated and wine produced, and the area is noted for its fruit preservation. Bee-keeping also takes place and honey is produced. Loiret has little industrial development, and commerce is centred about the sale of corn, timber, cattle, chestnuts, cider, honey, flour, fruits, fish, salt, saffron and wool. The only minerals extracted are stone, limestone, marl and clay.

Politics

The president of the Departmental Council is Marc Gaudet, elected in 2017.

Current National Assembly Representatives

Transport
The department benefits from its proximity to Paris to which it has good transport links. Orléans does not yet have a TGV but is connected to Paris via fast express trains. The A71 autoroute links Paris with Orléans and Clermont-Ferrand, the A10 autoroute links Paris with Orléans and Bordeaux, and the Route nationale 20 links Paris with Orléans, Limoges, Toulouse and Spain.

Tourism
Orléans is a popular tourist destination and is associated with Joan of Arc. The Cathedral of Sainte-Croix was built in the Gothic style between 1278 and 1329, destroyed by Protestant forces in 1568, and rebuilt between the 17th and 19th centuries.

See also
Cantons of the Loiret department
Communes of the Loiret department
Arrondissements of the Loiret department

References

External links

Prefecture website 
Departmental Council website 

 

 
1790 establishments in France
Departments of Centre-Val de Loire
States and territories established in 1790